The women's pentathlon event at the 1967 Summer Universiade was held at the National Olympic Stadium in Tokyo on 31 August and 1 September 1967.

Results

References

Athletics at the 1967 Summer Universiade
1967